Seventeam Electronics is a Taiwanese manufacturer of power supplies for Personal Computer and Industrial PC. Some earlier models from Seventeam were sold by Cooler Master and SilverStone under their own respective brand names.

See also
 List of companies of Taiwan

References

 Torres, Gabriel (2008-03-06) "ST-420BKV 420W Power Supply Review". HardwareSecrets.com.  
 Torres, Gabriel (2008-11-20) "ST-550P-AG Power Supply Review". HardwareSecrets.com. 
 Methious (2008-07-02) "V-Force 850W PSU". PCFrags.com. 
 "Seventeam 1200W - 3DGAMEMAN's Choice Award"

External links
 Official website
 Who is the manufacturer of your PSU?

Computer power supply unit manufacturers
Electronics companies of Taiwan
Manufacturing companies established in 1986
Privately held companies
Taiwanese companies established in 1986